Plaus is a comune (municipality) in South Tyrol in northern Italy, located about  north-west of the city of Bolzano.

Geography

Plaus  is one of the three municipalities of South Tyrol whose name remained unchanged by the early 20th century renaming programme which aimed at replacing mostly German place names with Italianised versions, the other two being Gais and Lana.

Plaus borders the following municipalities: Algund, Naturns and Partschins.

History

Coat-of-arms
The shield is argent a fess gules and three sable eagles. It is the arms of the Lord of Tarant, who lived in the Tarantsberg Castle until 1291. The emblem was adopted in 1966.

Society

Linguistic distribution
According to the 2011 census, 97.58% of the population speak German and 2.42% Italian as their first language.

Demographic evolution

References

External links
Official Website of the municipality of Plaus (in German and Italian)

Municipalities of South Tyrol